Aldebaran (Arabic: “The Follower”, "الدبران") is a star located in the zodiac constellation of Taurus. It has the Bayer designation α Tauri, which is Latinized to Alpha Tauri and abbreviated Alpha Tau or α Tau. Aldebaran varies in brightness from an apparent visual magnitude 0.75 down to 0.95, making it the brightest star in the constellation, as well as (typically) the fourteenth-brightest star in the night sky. It is positioned at a distance of approximately 65 light-years from the Sun. The star lies along the line of sight to the nearby Hyades cluster.

As a giant star, it has moved off the main sequence on the Hertzsprung–Russell diagram after depleting its supply of hydrogen in the core. The star spins slowly and takes 520 days to complete a rotation. Aldebaran is believed to host a planet several times the mass of Jupiter, named .
The planetary exploration probe Pioneer 10 is heading in the general direction of the star and should make its closest approach in about two million years.

Nomenclature

The traditional name Aldebaran derives from the Arabic al Dabarān ("الدبران"), meaning "the follower", because it seems to follow the Pleiades.  In 2016, the International Astronomical Union Working Group on Star Names (WGSN) approved the proper name Aldebaran for this star.

Aldebaran is the brightest star in the constellation Taurus and so has the Bayer designation α Tauri, Latinised as Alpha Tauri. It has the Flamsteed designation 87 Tauri as the 87th star in the constellation of approximately 7th magnitude or brighter, ordered by right ascension. It also has the Bright Star Catalogue number 1457, the HD number 29139, and the Hipparcos catalogue number 21421, mostly seen in scientific publications.

It is a variable star listed in the General Catalogue of Variable Stars, but it is listed using its Bayer designation and does not have a separate variable star designation.

Aldebaran and several nearby stars are included in double star catalogues such as the Washington Double Star Catalog as WDS 04359+1631 and the Aitken Double Star Catalogue as ADS 3321. It was included with an 11th-magnitude companion as a double star as H IV 66 in the Herschel Catalogue of Double Stars and Σ II 2 in the Struve Double Star Catalog, and together with a 14th-magnitude star as β 550 in the Burnham Double Star Catalogue.

Observation

Aldebaran is one of the easiest stars to find in the night sky, partly due to its brightness and partly due to being near one of the more noticeable asterisms in the sky. Following the three stars of Orion's belt in the opposite direction to Sirius, the first bright star encountered is Aldebaran.
It is best seen at midnight between late November and early December.

The star is, by chance, in the line of sight between the Earth and the Hyades, so it has the appearance of being the brightest member of the open cluster, but the cluster that forms the bull's-head-shaped asterism is more than twice as far away, at about 150 light years.

Aldebaran is 5.47 degrees south of the ecliptic and so can be occulted by the Moon. Such occultations occur when the Moon's ascending node is near the autumnal equinox. A series of 49 occultations occurred starting on 29 January 2015 and ending at 3 September 2018. Each event was visible from points in the northern hemisphere or close to the equator; people in e.g. Australia or South Africa can never observe an Aldebaran occultation since it is too far south of the ecliptic. A reasonably accurate estimate for the diameter of Aldebaran was obtained during the occultation of 22 September 1978. In the 2020s, Aldebaran is in conjunction in ecliptic longitude with the sun around May 30 of each year.

With a near-infrared J band magnitude of −2.1, only Betelgeuse (−2.9), R Doradus (−2.6), and Arcturus (−2.2) are brighter at that wavelength.

Observational history

On 11 March AD 509, a lunar occultation of Aldebaran was observed in Athens, Greece. English astronomer Edmund Halley studied the timing of this event, and in 1718 concluded that Aldebaran must have changed position since that time, moving several minutes of arc further to the north. This, as well as observations of the changing positions of stars Sirius and Arcturus, led to the discovery of proper motion. Based on present day observations, the position of Aldebaran has shifted 7′ in the last 2000 years; roughly a quarter the diameter of the full moon.  Due to precession of the equinoxes, 5,000 years ago the vernal equinox was close to Aldebaran. Between 420,000 and 210,000 years ago, Alderbaran was the brightest star in the night sky, peaking in brightness 320,000 years ago with an apparent magnitude of -1.54.

English astronomer William Herschel discovered a faint companion to Aldebaran in 1782; an 11th-magnitude star at an angular separation of 117″. This star was shown to be itself a close double star by S. W. Burnham in 1888, and he discovered an additional 14th-magnitude companion at an angular separation of 31″. Follow-on measurements of proper motion showed that Herschel's companion was diverging from Aldebaran, and hence they were not physically connected. However, the companion discovered by Burnham had almost exactly the same proper motion as Aldebaran, suggesting that the two formed a wide binary star system.

Working at his private observatory in Tulse Hill, England, in 1864 William Huggins performed the first studies of the spectrum of Aldebaran, where he was able to identify the lines of nine elements, including iron, sodium, calcium, and magnesium. In 1886, Edward C. Pickering at the Harvard College Observatory used a photographic plate to capture fifty absorption lines in the spectrum of Aldebaran. This became part of the Draper Catalogue, published in 1890. By 1887, the photographic technique had improved to the point that it was possible to measure a star's radial velocity from the amount of Doppler shift in the spectrum.

Aldebaran was observed using an interferometer attached to the Hooker Telescope at the Mount Wilson Observatory in 1921 in order to measure its angular diameter, but it was not resolved in these observations.

The extensive history of observations of Aldebaran led to it being included in the list of 33 stars chosen as benchmarks for the Gaia mission to calibrate derived stellar parameters.  It had previously been used to calibrate instruments on board the Hubble Space Telescope.

Physical characteristics

Aldebaran is listed as the spectral standard for type K5+ III stars. Its spectrum shows that it is a giant star that has evolved off the main sequence band of the HR diagram after exhausting the hydrogen at its core. The collapse of the center of the star into a degenerate helium core has ignited a shell of hydrogen outside the core and Aldebaran is now on the red giant branch (RGB).

Its metallicity is about 30% lower than the Sun's.

Asteroseismology has determined that it is about 16% more massive than the Sun, yet it shines with 518 times the Sun's luminosity due to the expanded radius. The angular diameter of Aldebaran has been measured many times. It is 44 times the diameter of the Sun, approximately 61 million kilometres.

Aldebaran is a slightly variable star, assigned to the slow irregular type LB. The General Catalogue of Variable Stars indicates variation between apparent magnitude 0.75 and 0.95 from historical reports. Modern studies show a smaller amplitude, with some showing almost no variation. Hipparcos photometry shows an amplitude of only about 0.02 magnitudes and a possible period around 18 days. Intensive ground-based photometry showed variations of up to 0.03 magnitudes and a possible period around 91 days. Analysis of observations over a much longer period still find a total amplitude likely to be less than 0.1 magnitudes, and the variation is considered to be irregular.

The photosphere shows abundances of carbon, oxygen, and nitrogen that suggest the giant has gone through its first dredge-up stage—a normal step in the evolution of a star into a red giant during which material from deep within the star is brought up to the surface by convection. With its slow rotation, Aldebaran lacks a dynamo needed to generate a corona and hence is not a source of hard X-ray emission. However, small scale magnetic fields may still be present in the lower atmosphere, resulting from convection turbulence near the surface. The measured strength of the magnetic field on Aldebaran is 0.22 Gauss. Any resulting soft X-ray emissions from this region may be attenuated by the chromosphere, although ultraviolet emission has been detected in the spectrum. This stellar wind may be generated by the weak magnetic fields in the lower atmosphere.

Beyond the chromosphere of Aldebaran is an extended molecular outer atmosphere (MOLsphere) where the temperature is cool enough for molecules of gas to form. The spectrum reveals lines of carbon monoxide, water, and titanium oxide. Outside the MOLSphere, the stellar wind continues to expand until it reaches the termination shock boundary with the hot, ionized interstellar medium that dominates the Local Bubble, forming a roughly spherical astrosphere with a radius of around 1,000 AU, centered on Aldebaran.

Visual companions
Five faint stars appear close to Aldebaran in the sky. These double star components were given upper-case Latin letter designations more or less in the order of their discovery, with the letter A reserved for the primary star. Some characteristics of these components, including their position relative to Aldebaran, are shown in the table.

Some surveys, for example Gaia Data Release 2, have indicated that Alpha Tauri B may have about the same proper motion and parallax as Aldebaran and thus may be a physical binary system. These measurements are difficult, since the dim B component appears so close to the bright primary star, and the margin of error is too large to establish (or exclude) a physical relationship between the two. So far neither the B component, nor anything else, has been unambiguously shown to be physically associated with Aldebaran. A spectral type of M2.5 has been published for Alpha Tauri B.

Alpha Tauri CD is a binary system with the C and D component stars gravitationally bound to and co-orbiting each other. These co-orbiting stars have been shown to be located far beyond Aldebaran and are members of the Hyades star cluster. As with the rest of the stars in the cluster they do not physically interact with Aldebaran in any way.

Planetary system

In 1993 radial velocity measurements of Aldebaran, Arcturus and Pollux showed that Aldebaran exhibited a long-period radial velocity oscillation, which could be interpreted as a substellar companion. However, all three stars surveyed showed similar oscillations yielding similar companion masses, and the authors concluded that the variation was likely to be intrinsic to the star rather than due to the gravitational effect of a companion.

In 2015 a study showed stable long-term evidence for both a planetary companion and stellar activity. An asteroseismic analysis of the residuals to the planet fit has determined that Aldebaran b has a minimum mass of  Jupiter masses, and that when the star was on the main sequence it would have given this planet Earth-like levels of illumination and therefore, potentially, temperature. This would place it and any of its moons in the habitable zone. Follow-up study in 2019 have found the evidence for planetary existence inconclusive though.

Etymology and mythology
Aldebaran was originally نَيِّر اَلدَّبَرَان (Nayyir al-Dabarān in Arabic), meaning "the bright one of the follower", since it follows the Pleiades; in fact, the Arabs sometimes also ‍applied ‍‍the ‍name al-Dabarān to the Hyades ‍as ‍a whole. A variety of transliterated spellings have been used, with the current Aldebaran becoming standard relatively recently.

Mythology
This easily seen and striking star in its suggestive asterism is a popular subject for ancient and modern myths.
 Mexican culture: For the Seris of northwestern Mexico, this star provides light for the seven women giving birth (Pleiades). The lunar month corresponding to October is called  "Aldebaran's path".
 Australian Aboriginal culture: amongst indigenous people of the Clarence River, in north-eastern New South Wales, this star is the ancestor Karambal, who stole another man's wife. The woman's husband tracked him down and burned the tree in which he was hiding. It is believed that he rose to the sky as smoke and became the star Aldebaran.

Names in other languages
 In Hindu astronomy it is identified as the lunar mansion Rohini ("the red one") and as one of the twenty-seven daughters of Daksha and the wife of the god Chandra (Moon).

 In Ancient Greek it has been called  Lampadias, literally "torch-like or -bearer".

In modern culture

As the brightest star in a Zodiac constellation, it is given great significance within astrology.

The name Aldebaran or Alpha Tauri has been adopted many times, including
 Aldebaran Rock in Antarctica
 United States Navy stores ship  and Italian frigate Aldebaran (F 590)
 proposed micro-satellite launch vehicle  Aldebaran
 French company Aldebaran Robotics
 fashion brand AlphaTauri
 Formula 1 team Scuderia AlphaTauri, previously known as Toro Rosso

The star also appears in works of fiction such as Far From the Madding Crowd (1874) and Down and Out in Paris and London (1933).  It is frequently seen in science fiction, including the Lensman series (1948-1954) and Fallen Dragon (2001).  

Aldebaran regularly features in conspiracy theories as one of the origins of extraterrestrial aliens, often linked to Nazi UFOs. A well-known example is the German conspiracy theorist Axel Stoll, who considered the star the home of the Aryan race and the target of expeditions by the Wehrmacht.

The planetary exploration probe Pioneer 10 is no longer powered or in contact with Earth, but its trajectory is taking it in the general direction of Aldebaran.  It is expected to make its closest approach in about two million years.

The Austrian chemist Carl Auer von Welsbach proposed the name aldebaranium (chemical symbol Ad) for a rare earth element that he (among others) had found. Today, it is called ytterbium (symbol Yb).

See also 
 Lists of stars
 List of brightest stars
 List of nearest bright stars
 Historical brightest stars
 Taurus (Chinese astronomy)

References

External links

 
 Daytime occultation of Aldebaran by the Moon (Moscow, Russia) YouTube video

K-type giants
Slow irregular variables
Hypothetical planetary systems

Taurus (constellation)
 
Tauri, Alpha
1457
BD+16 0629
Tauri, 087
0171.1
029139
021421
Aldebaran
Aldebaran
245873777